Giselle Rosselli is an Australian singer-songwriter, multi-instrumentalist and producer, sometimes seen mononymously as Giselle. Rosselli provided lead vocals and wrote lyrics for the first original song by indie electro DJ duo, Flight Facilities, Crave You. The track was listed at No. 19 on the Hottest 100 of 2010, by listeners of national radio station, Triple J. Also in 2010 Rosselli's track, "They Stay Down Deep", was featured on the United Kingdom TV series Skins (series 4, episode 7). In April 2012 Rosselli released a solo single, "Silk".

Biography 

Giselle Rosselli was born on 2 December 1990 and was raised in Sydney. She is the daughter of local architect, Luigi Rosselli, and visual artist, Juliet Holmes à Court. Rosselli has two brothers. Growing up in a creative family, she began to write her own music as a way of developing her artistic independence and creativity. Originally studying mathematics at the University of Melbourne, she deferred her course in mid-2010 to pursue writing and recording full-time.

Rosselli worked with indie electro DJ duo, Flight Facilities on the track, "Crave You". The duo consists of Hugo Gruzman and James Lyell and they began mixing tracks by other artists in 2009. Rosselli co-wrote "Crave You" with Gruzman and Lyell.  As a remix the song "Crave You" was featured on MTV's partnered website Ourstage through American Rap artist Jay Entendre formerly known as The Kid Bilal as a remix called "She Craves Me".

Gruzman told Dave Ruby Howe of In the Mix how the duo had contacted Rosselli to get help with their first original track. Rosselli had met Gruzman in mid-2009, he was interested in using her skill on xylophone, however, after "[I] heard her sing and I just knew that she had to do the song. We sent the track over to her and she smashed it. We were so lucky to be able to work with her, she's just great". It was listed at No. 19 on the Hottest 100 of 2010, by listeners of national radio station, Triple J. As a remix it was featured on MTV's partnered website Ourstage through American rap artist, The Kid Bilal, as "She Craves Me". It was used as the soundtrack to Myer's 2010 Spring Racing Carnival TV commercial campaign.

In October 2010 she provided vocals for Bag Raiders debut album of the same name.  Also in that year Rosselli's track, "They Stay Down Deep", was used on the United Kingdom TV series, Skins series 4, episode 7.

In April 2012 Rosselli issued a solo single, "Silk", which received rotation at Triple J by Richard Kingsmill. Chad Hillard of HillyDilly website praised her vocals "it's as if everything else you were thinking about disappears. Stress, anxiety, whatever, once her voice hits you, everything dissipates". In October 2012 she released another single, "Nigerian Rubiks Cube".

References

External links 

 

Australian multi-instrumentalists
Living people
21st-century Australian singers
Australian women singer-songwriters
Australian women pop singers
21st-century Australian women singers
Singers from Sydney
1990 births